Tongji (Tâi-lô: tâng-ki) or Jitong is a Chinese folk religious practitioner, usually translated as a "spirit medium", "oracle", or "shaman".

This word compounds tong  "child; youth; boy servant" and ji  "to divine" (cf. fuji  "divination; planchette writing").  Regional variants include Hokkien tâng-ki  and Cantonese gei-tung  or san-daa .

A tongji or jitong is a person believed to have been chosen by a particular shen  "god; spirit" as the earthly vehicle for divine expression.  The Chinese differentiate a wu  "shaman; healer; spirit medium" who gains control of forces in the spirit world versus a tongji who appears to be entirely under the control of forces in the spirit world.

External links and references

 Andersen, Poul. 2008. "Tâng-ki (or jitong)  (or ) spirit-medium", in The Encyclopedia of Taoism, ed. by Fabrizio Pregadio, pp. 964-966. Routledge.
 Elliott, Alan J. A. 1955. Chinese Spirit Medium Cults in Singapore. Monographs on Social Anthropology, No. 14. Department of Anthropology, London School of Economics and Political Science.
 Groot, Jan Jakob Maria. 1892-1910. The Religious System of China: Its Ancient Forms, Evolution, History and Present Aspect, Manners, Customs and Social Institutions Connected Therewith. 6 volumes. Brill Publishers.
 Jordan, David K. 1976. "A Medium's First Trance", Anthropology: Perspective on Humanity, ed. by Marc J. Swartz and David K. Jordan. John Wiley & Sons.
 Jordan, David K. 1977. "How to Become a Chinese Spirit Medium".
 Jordan, David K. 1999.  Gods, Ghosts, & Ancestors: Folk Religion in a Taiwanese village. 3rd edition.  Department of Anthropology, UCSD.
 Myers, John T. 1974. A Chinese Spirit-medium Temple in Kwun Tong: A Preliminary Report. Social Research Centre, Chinese University of Hong Kong.
 Myers, John T. 1975. "A Hong Kong Spirit-medium Temple", Journal of the Hong Kong Branch of the Royal Asiatic Society 15:16-27.

Anthropology of religion
Asian shamanism
Practices in Chinese folk religion
Shamanism in China
Spirituality